Follow the Prophet is an American film that was written by and stars Robert Chimento, which was created to show how polygamist lifestyles affect the children involved. In the film, a young girl escaping from a polygamist cult is aided by an U.S. Army colonel and a renegade sheriff who join forces to save an even younger girl from a secret "marriage" to the cult's leader.

Plot
On her 15th birthday Avery Colden (Annie Burgstede) discovers from her father (David Conrad) that she is to be given as a secret bride to the new prophet (Tom Noonan) of a religious cult. She escapes with the help of army Colonel Jude Marks (Robert Chimento) and a renegade sheriff (Diane Venora). When they find out that her younger sister is chosen to take her place as the secret bride they join forces to expose the truth that lies hidden in a town in Utah. Marks calls in favors from the military and Washington but even that may not be enough to help them fight the deeply secretive cult.

Production
Filming took place in Portland, Oregon.

Release

The film premiered in competition at the 2009 Santa Barbara International Film Festival and was also screened at the Newport Beach Film Festival. Follow the Prophet opened theatrically on April 30, 2010 at a benefit for the Texas Center For The Missing,  Coordinator of the Houston Regional Amber Alert.
It was released for pay-per-view on May 1, 2010 and on DVD on May 14.

Reception
Variety magazine describes Follow the Prophet as generally an "above-average" made-for-cable film.

Recognition
 Palm Beach International Film Festival, 2010. Official selection.
 WorldFest-Houston International Film Festival, 2010. Remi Award.

References

External links
 
 
 
 

American independent films
Films set in Utah
Films about Mormonism
Mormon fundamentalism in fiction
Films shot in Portland, Oregon
2009 drama films
2009 films
Works about polygamy in Mormonism
2000s English-language films
2000s American films